Loran Özz Ceko Nûjen, (born in Turkey on 20 June 1975), is a Turkish-born Kurdish-Swedish stand up comedian, scriptwriter, TV show host and actor who lives in Sweden.

Filmography
 Dålig stämning (2013) – from his tour of his first solo standup show filmed at the Hotel Rival in Stockholm
 Özz Nûjen: Statsminister (2014) – concert telefilm

References

External links

Özz Nûjens intervju för Uppdrag Granskning: 
Egen privat inspelning på Youtube: https://www.youtube.com/watch?time_continue=0&v=G5qru1cnIwo
SVTs intervju: https://www.svtplay.se/video/17810519/uppdrag-granskning/uppdrag-granskning-avsnitt-16-2?start=auto&tab=2018

Swedish comedians
Swedish people of Kurdish descent
Turkish emigrants to Sweden
1975 births
Living people